Walter Shumway (1884–1965) was an American film actor. A character actor he appeared in a variety of supporting roles in films and serials between 1918 and 1950. He was married to the actress Corra Beach.

Selected filmography
 Wine (1924)
 Pretty Ladies (1925)
 Return of Grey Wolf (1926)
 Hi-Jacking Rustlers (1926)
 Catch-As-Catch-Can (1927)
 The Pinto Kid (1928)
 The Apache Raider (1928)
 The Mystery Rider (1928)
 The Yellow Cameo (1928)
 Greased Lightning (1928)
 The Tip Off (1929)
 Headin' North (1930)
 The Spell of the Circus (1931)
The Night Rider (1932)
 Outlaw Justice (1932)
 Ghost City (1932)
 Fighting Shadows (1935)
 What Becomes of the Children? (1936)
 Whirlwind Horseman (1938)
 Six-Gun Rhythm (1939)
 The Showdown (1940)
 Wrangler's Roost (1941)
 Double Cross (1941)
 Girls of the Big House (1945)

References

Bibliography
 Agrasánchez, Rogelio . Guillermo Calles: A Biography of the Actor and Mexican Cinema Pioneer. McFarland, 2010.
 Rainey, Buck. Serials and Series: A World Filmography, 1912-1956. McFarland, 2015.

External links

American male film actors
1884 births
1965 deaths
People from Cleveland